Air Commodore Ruth Mary Bryceson Montague (born 1 June 1939) is a British air force officer, who served as Director of the Women's Royal Air Force (WRAF) from 1989 to 1994. She was the last head of the WRAF, before it was disestablished in 1994 and merged into the Royal Air Force.

References

1939 births
Living people
Women's Royal Air Force officers